Hulk (also known as The Hulk) is a 2003 American superhero film based on the Marvel Comics character of the same name, created by Stan Lee and Jack Kirby. Directed by Ang Lee and written by James Schamus, Michael France, and John Turman from a story by Schamus, it stars Eric Bana as Bruce Banner and Hulk, alongside Jennifer Connelly, Sam Elliott, Josh Lucas, and Nick Nolte. The film explores Bruce Banner's origins. After a lab accident involving gamma radiation, he transforms into a giant, green-skinned creature known as the Hulk whenever stressed or emotionally provoked. The United States military pursues him, and he clashes with his biological father, who has dark plans for his son.

Development started in 1990. At one time, Joe Johnston and then Jonathan Hensleigh were to direct. Hensleigh, John Turman, Michael France, Zak Penn, J. J. Abrams, Michael Tolkin, David Hayter, Scott Alexander, and Larry Karaszewski wrote more scripts before Ang Lee and James Schamus's involvement. The project was filmed primarily in California from March to August 2002, mainly in the San Francisco Bay Area.

Hulk was released by Universal Pictures on June 20, 2003, and grossed $245 million worldwide, becoming one of the highest-grossing films of 2003. The film received praise for its cast's performances, ambition and style, but criticism for its dialogue, lack of action sequences, and computer-generated imagery. A planned sequel was repurposed as a reboot titled The Incredible Hulk and released on June 13, 2008, as the second film in the Marvel Cinematic Universe.

Plot

David Banner is a genetics researcher for the government trying to improve human DNA. His supervisor, Colonel Thaddeus "Thunderbolt" Ross, forbids human experimentation, so David experiments on himself. His wife, Edith, soon gives birth to their son, Bruce Banner. David realizes Bruce inherited his mutant DNA and attempts to find a cure. After discovering his experiments, Ross shuts down David's research; David rigs Desert Base's gamma reactor to explode as revenge. Believing he is dangerous, David tries to kill Bruce but accidentally murders Edith when she gets between them; the trauma makes Bruce suppress his early childhood memories. Ross arrests and sends David to a mental hospital, putting the 4-year-old Bruce into foster care. Mrs. Krenzler adopts him, and Bruce assumes the surname, growing up believing his birth parents are dead.

Thirty years later, Bruce is a brilliant scientist working at the Berkeley Lab with his girlfriend and Ross's estranged daughter, Betty Ross. Representing the private research company Atheon, the shady Glenn Talbot becomes interested in the scientists' nanomeds research to create regenerating soldiers for the military-industrial complex. David reappears as a janitor in the lab building to infiltrate Bruce's life. The now-general Ross investigates, becoming concerned for Betty's safety around Bruce.

Bruce saves a colleague named Harper from an accident with a malfunctioning gammasphere. Bruce wakes in a hospital bed and tells Betty he feels better than ever, but Betty cannot fathom his survival since the nanomeds killed everything else; unknown to them, the radiation merged with Bruce's altered DNA. Later, David meets Bruce, revealing their relationship and hinting at Bruce's mutation. He later uses samples of Bruce's DNA for animal experimentation. Bruce's increasing rage from the tensions around him activates his gamma-radiated DNA; he becomes the Hulk and destroys the lab. Betty finds Bruce unconscious in his home the next day, barely remembering the previous night. Ross arrives later to question Bruce before Betty locates David to investigate him. After hours of interrogation, Ross seizes the lab and places Bruce under house arrest. David calls Bruce that night, revealing he mutated his three dogs and sicced them on Betty, enraging him. Bemoaning the lab's destruction, Talbot attacks Bruce, who transforms, injuring Talbot and Ross's MPs. The Hulk finds Betty at her forest cabin, saves her from the dogs, and changes back.

Betty calls Ross the following day; the army tranquilizes and takes Bruce to Desert Base. Deeming him doomed to follow in David's footsteps, Ross doubts helping Bruce, but Betty persuades Ross to let her try. David subjects himself to the nanomeds and gammasphere, becoming able to meld with and absorb the properties of anything he touches. Talbot wrestles control from Ross, forcing Betty to return home. Seeking to profit from the Hulk's power, Talbot fails to provoke Bruce and puts him in an isolation tank. David confronts Betty at her house, offering to surrender himself yet asking to speak to Bruce "one last time." Talbot induces a nightmare from Bruce's repressed memories and triggers a transformation. Trapping the Hulk in sticky foam, Talbot tries taking a sample of him, but the Hulk breaks free. Talbot gets killed after firing an explosive round that backfires, and Ross resumes command. The Hulk escapes the base, battles the army in the desert, and leaps to San Francisco to find Betty. She convinces Ross to take her to the Hulk, returning Bruce to normal.

Bruce and David talk at a base in the city while Ross watches, threatening to incinerate them. David has descended into megalomania, wanting Bruce's power to destroy his enemies. After Bruce refuses, David bites into a high-voltage cable when Ross powers it, absorbs the energy and mutates into a powerful electrical entity. Bruce becomes the Hulk and fights and overpowers him; they are presumed dead after Ross orders a Gamma Charge Bomb to end the battle. A year later, Ross has Betty under constant surveillance, as many Hulk sightings get reported. In the Amazon Rainforest, Bruce is alive, and in exile as a medical camp doctor. His camp gets overrun by soldiers who try to steal their supplies. Bruce warns their commander, "You're making me angry. You wouldn't like me when I'm angry". The Hulk bellows in rage.

Cast
 Eric Bana as Bruce Banner / Hulk:A gamma radiation research scientist. After exposure to elevated gamma radiation levels, he becomes a enormous green humanoid monster when enraged or agitated, and also has the ability to grow larger in size and become stronger when angered in his Hulk form. He is legally known as "Bruce Krenzler" throughout the film. Bana was cast in October 2001, signing for an additional two sequels. Ang Lee felt obliged to cast Bana upon seeing Chopper and first approached the actor in July 2001. Other actors heavily pursued the role. Bana was also in heavy contention for Ghost Rider but lost out to Nicolas Cage. Bana explained, "I was obsessed with the TV show. I was never a huge comic book reader when I was a kid but was completely obsessed with the television show." It was widely reported Billy Crudup turned down the role. Johnny Depp and Steve Buscemi were reportedly under consideration for the lead. David Duchovny and Jeff Goldblum auditioned for the role. Edward Norton, who went on to play Bruce in The Incredible Hulk, expressed interest in the role but turned it down as he was disappointed with the script. Tom Cruise was also offered the role but he turned it down.
 Michael and David Kronenberg as Young Bruce Banner
 Mike Erwin as Teenage Bruce Banner
 Ang Lee provided motion capture and voice for the Hulk.
 
 Jennifer Connelly as Betty Ross:Bruce's ex-girlfriend and colleague, General Ross's estranged daughter, and possibly the only one who can make the Hulk revert into Bruce. Director Ang Lee attracted Connelly to the role. "He's not talking about a guy running around in green tights and a glossy fun-filled movie for kids. He's talking along the lines of tragedy and psychodrama. I find it interesting, the green monster of rage and greed, jealousy and fear in all of us."
 Rhiannon Leigh Wryn as Young Betty Ross
 Sam Elliott as Thaddeus "Thunderbolt" Ross:A four-star general and Betty's estranged father. Ross was responsible for prohibiting David Banner from his lab work after learning of his dangerous experiments. Elliot said his performance was similar to his portrayal of Basil L. Plumley in We Were Soldiers. Elliott accepted the role without reading the script, being excited to work with Ang Lee, and researched Hulk comic books for the part.
 Todd Tesen as Young Thaddeus Ross
 Josh Lucas as Glenn Talbot:A ruthless and arrogant former soldier who has a history with Betty. He offers Bruce and Betty a chance to work for him at the research company Atheon and make self-healing super soldiers.
 Nick Nolte as David Banner:Bruce's mentally unstable biological father who's also a genetics research scientist. He spent several years locked away for causing a gamma reactor explosion and accidentally killing his wife, Edith. David eventually gains absorbing powers, reminiscent of the comic book character Absorbing Man, which first appeared in the film's early scripts. At one time, he also becomes a towering creature composed of electricity, reminiscent of Zzzax, one of the Hulk's enemies in the comic series.  Nolte agreed to participate in the film when Lee described the project as a "Greek tragedy."
 Paul Kersey as Young David Banner
 Cara Buono as Edith Banner:Bruce's biological mother, whom he cannot remember. She is heard but mostly appears in Bruce's nightmares.
 Celia Weston as Mrs. Krenzler:Bruce's adoptive mother, who cared for him after Edith's death and David's incarceration.
 Kevin Rankin as Harper:Bruce's colleague, whom he saved from the gamma radiation.

Hulk co-creator/executive producer Stan Lee and former Hulk actor Lou Ferrigno made a cameo appearance as security guards. Johnny Kastl and Daniel Dae Kim have small roles as soldiers.

Production

Development

Jonathan Hensleigh
Producers Avi Arad and Gale Anne Hurd began developing Hulk in 1990, the same year of the airing of the final TV movie based on the 1970s TV series, Death of the Incredible Hulk. They set the property up at Universal Pictures in 1992. Michael France and Stan Lee were invited into Universal's offices in 1993, with France writing the script. Universal's concept was to have the Hulk battle terrorists, an idea France disliked. John Turman, a Hulk comic book fan, was brought to write the script in 1994, getting Lee's approval. Heavily influenced by the Tales to Astonish issues, Turman wrote ten drafts and pitted the Hulk against General Ross and the military and  the Leader, also including Rick Jones and the atomic explosion origin from the comics along with Brian Banner as the explanation for Bruce's inner anger. Universal had mixed feelings over Turman's script, but future screenwriters would use many elements.

Hurd brought her husband Jonathan Hensleigh as co-producer the following year, and Universal hired Industrial Light & Magic to create the Hulk with computer-generated imagery. Universal was courting France once more to write the screenplay but changed when Joe Johnston became the director in April 1997. The studio wanted Hensleigh to rewrite the script due to his successful results on Johnston's Jumanji. Universal fired France before he wrote a single page but gave him a buy-off. Johnston dropped out of directing in July 1997 in favor of October Sky, and Hensleigh convinced Universal to make the Hulk his directing debut. Universal brought Turman back a second time to write two more drafts. Zak Penn then rewrote it. His script featured a fight between the Hulk and a school of sharks, and two scenes he eventually used for the 2008 film: Banner realizing he cannot have sex, and triggering a transformation by falling out of a helicopter. Hensleigh rewrote from scratch, coming up with a brand new storyline featuring Bruce Banner, who, before the accident which turns him into the Hulk, experiments with gamma-irradiated insect DNA on three convicts, transforming them into "insect men" that cause havoc.

Filming was to start in December 1997 in Arizona for a mid 1999 release, but filming was pushed back for four months. Hensleigh subsequently rewrote the script with J. J. Abrams. Scott Alexander and Larry Karaszewski were also brought on board to rewrite, with Hensleigh still attached as director. In October 1997, Hulk had entered pre-production with the creation of prosthetic makeup and computer animation already underway. Gregory Sporleder was cast as "Novak", Banner's archenemy, while Lynn "Red" Williams was cast as a convict who transforms into a combination of human, ant, and beetle. In March 1998, Universal put Hulk on hiatus due to its escalating $100 million budget and worries of Hensleigh directing his first film. $20 million was already spent on script development, computer animation, and prosthetics work. Hensleigh immediately went to rewrite the script to reduce the budget.

Michael France
Hensleigh found the rewriting process too complicated and resigned, saying he "wasted nine months in pre-production". It took another eight months for France to convince Universal and the producers to let him try to write a script for the third time. France claimed, "Someone within the Universal hierarchy wasn't sure if this was a science fiction adventure, or a comedy, and I kept getting directions to write both. I think that at some point when I wasn't in the room, there may have been discussions about turning it into a Jim Carrey or Adam Sandler movie." France was writing the script on the fast track from July—September 1999. Filming for Hulk was to start in April 2000.

France stated his vision of the film was different from the other drafts, which based Bruce Banner on his "amiable, nerdy genius" incarnation in the 1960s. France cited inspiration from the 1980s Hulk stories, which introduced Brian Banner, Bruce's abusive father who killed his mother. His script had Banner trying to create cells with regenerative capabilities to convince himself that he is not like his father. However, he has anger management issues before the Hulk is born, which makes everything worse. The "Don't make me angry..." line from the 1978 TV series The Incredible Hulk became the dialogue that Banner's father would say before beating his son. Elements such as the "Gammasphere", Bruce and Betty's tragic romance, and the black ops made it to the final film. France turned in his final drafts in late 1999 – January 2000.

Ang Lee
Michael Tolkin and David Hayter rewrote the script even after the producers' positive response to France's script. Tolkin was brought in January 2000, and Universal brought Hayter in September. Hayter's draft features The Leader, Zzzax, and the Absorbing Man as the villains, who are depicted as Banner's colleagues and get caught in the same accident that creates the Hulk. Director Ang Lee and his producing partner James Schamus became involved with the film on January 20, 2001. Lee was dissatisfied with Hayter's script and commissioned Schamus for a rewrite, merging Banner's father with the Absorbing Man. Lee cited influences from King Kong, Frankenstein, Jekyll and Hyde, Beauty and the Beast, Faust, and Greek mythology to interpret the story. Schamus said he had found the storyline that introduced Brian Banner, allowing Lee to write a drama that again explored father-son themes.

Schamus was still rewriting the script in October 2001. In early 2002, as filming was underway, Michael France read all the scripts for the Writers Guild of America to determine who would get final credit. France criticized Schamus and Hayter for claiming they were aiming to make Banner a more in-depth character, saddened they had denigrated his and Turman's work in interviews. Schamus elected to get solo credit. France said, "James Schamus did a significant amount of work on the screenplay. For example, he brought in the Hulk dogs from the comics and he made the decision to use Banner's father as a real character in the present. But he used quite a lot of elements from John Turman's scripts and quite a lot from mine, and that's why we were credited." France, Turman, and Schamus received final credit. In December 2001, a theatrical release date for June 20, 2003, was announced, with the title of The Hulk. Schamus admitted that he was worried about making the film after seeing Spider-Man.

Filming
Filming began on March 18, 2002, in Arizona and moved on April 19 to the San Francisco Bay Area. Locations included Advanced Light Source, Lawrence Berkeley National Laboratory, Oakland, Treasure Island military base, and the sequoia forests of Porterville, before several weeks in the Utah and California deserts. The penultimate battle scene between Hulk and his father used the real Pear Lake in Sequoia National Park a backdrop. Filming then moved to the Universal backlot in Los Angeles, using Stage 12 for the water tank scene, and finished in the first week of August. Filming of Hulk constituted hiring 3,000 local workers, generating over $10 million into the local economy. Mychael Danna, who previously collaborated with Lee on Ride with the Devil and The Ice Storm, was set to compose the film score before dropping out. Danny Elfman was then hired.

Eric Bana commented that the shoot was "Ridiculously serious... a silent set, morbid in a lot of ways." Lee told him that he was shooting a Greek tragedy, and that he would be making a "whole other movie" about the Hulk at Industrial Light & Magic. An example of Lee's arthouse approach to the film was taking Bana to watch a bare-knuckle boxing match. Bana would later disfavorably reflect on his experience making the film as the majority of the time he was working indoors while the rest of the cast interacted with a CGI recreation of the Hulk, somewhat limiting his screen time. Computer animation supervisor Dennis Muren was on the set every day. One of the many visual images that presented an acting challenge for Bana was Lee's split-screen technique to mimic comic book page panels cinematically. This technique required many more takes of individual scenes than usual. Muren and other ILM animators used previous technology from Harry Potter and the Chamber of Secrets (for the Dobby character) to create the Hulk with computer-generated imagery. Additional software included PowerAnimator, Softimage Creative Environment, Softimage XSI, and Pixar's RenderMan. ILM started computer animation work in 2001 and completed it in May 2003, just one month before the film's release. Lee provided some motion capture work in post-production. Gary Rydstrom handled sound design at Skywalker Sound.

Music 

Danny Elfman composed the film score for Hulk after scoring Spider-Man the previous year. Frequent Ang Lee collaborator Mychael Danna was the film's original composer; however, studio executives rejected Danna's score for its non-traditional approach, which featured Japanese taiko, African drumming, and Arabic singing. Then Elfman was approached by Universal's president of film music, Kathy Nelson. With 37 days to compose over two hours of music, Elfman agreed out of respect to Lee. While instructing to retain much of the character of Danna's score, Lee pushed Elfman to write material that did not sound like his previous superhero scores. Danna said,"They did leave some of my music in the movie, so the Arabic singing and some of the drumming is mine. What happened is that they panicked, they brought in Danny and he heard what I've been doing and I guess he liked it."

A soundtrack album was released on June 17, 2003, by Decca Records. It features the song "Set Me Free" by Velvet Revolver, which plays during the end credits.

Release

Marketing
Universal Pictures spent $2.1 million to market the film in a 30-second television spot during Super Bowl XXXVII on January 26, 2003. A 70-second teaser trailer debuted in theaters with the release of Spider-Man one year earlier on May 3, 2002. This trailer was also attached to the home video releases of The Scorpion King. Just weeks before the film's release, several workprints leaked on the Internet. The public already criticized the visual and special effects, although it was not the film's final editing cut. The film received a novelization written by Hulk comic writer, Peter David. The tie-in Hulk video game was developed by Radical Entertainment and released by Vivendi Universal Games on May 28, 2003, and features a narrative that acts as a sequel to the film.

For the promotional campaign, Universal hired Nabisco, Post Consumer Brands, Pepsi, Hershey's, Kraft Foods Kraft Foods, Conagra Brands, Glad, and Snack Foods Limited.

Home media
Hulk was released on VHS and DVD on October 28, 2003. The DVD includes behind-the-scenes footage, enhanced viewing options that allow users to manipulate a 3-D Hulk model, and cast and crew commentaries. The film earned $61.2 million in DVD sales during 2003. Hulk was released on HD DVD on December 12, 2006, on Blu-ray on September 16, 2008, and on Ultra HD Blu-ray on July 9, 2019.

Reception

Box office
Hulk was released on June 20, 2003, grossing $24.3 million during its opening day. On its second day of release, it made $21.3 million. The film then earned $62.1 million in its opening weekend, which made it the 16th highest ever opener at the time. It was topped at the box office upon opening, beating out Finding Nemo. Moreover, it surpassed Austin Powers: The Spy Who Shagged Me to score the biggest June opening weekend. That record would last until 2004 when it was surpassed by Harry Potter and the Prisoner of Azkaban. Hulk went on to score the fourth-highest opening weekend for a Universal film, behind The Lost World: Jurassic Park, The Mummy Returns, and Bruce Almighty. It also achieved the fifth-highest opening weekend for a 2003 film, trailing only behind the latter film, Finding Nemo, X2, and The Matrix Reloaded. With a second weekend drop of 70%, it was the first opener above $20 million to drop over 65%. The film grossed $132.2 million in North America on a budget of $137 million. It made $113.2 million in foreign countries, coming to a worldwide total of $245.4 million. With a final North American gross of $132.2 million, it became the largest opener not to earn $150 million.

Internationally, Hulk had box office runs in several countries. It made $3.1 million from five Asian countries during its opening weekend, scoring a Hong Kong opening of $700,000 while doubling Gladiator. It grossed $122,000 in Malaysia, making it the country's second-highest opening of a Universal film, after The Lost World: Jurassic Park. In the UK, the film had made $5.6 million during its opening weekend, combined with $2.1 million from previews. In Mexico, Hulk became Universal's biggest opening in the country, generating $4.6 million and surpassing Jurassic Park III. In total, the international grosses include Argentina ($1.2 million), Australia ($6.4 million), France ($9.6 million), Germany ($4.1 million), Italy ($8 million), Japan ($7.6 million), Mexico ($11.6 million), South Korea ($2.5 million), Spain ($7.7 million), Taiwan ($3.7 million), and the United Kingdom ($13.9 million).

Critical response
Upon opening, Hulk received mixed reviews from critics. The website's critics' consensus reads, "While Ang Lee's ambitious film earns marks for style and an attempt at dramatic depth, there's ultimately too much talking and not enough smashing." Metacritic, which uses a weighted average, assigned the film a score of 54 out of 100 based on 40 critics, indicating "mixed or average reviews". Audiences polled by CinemaScore gave the film an average grade of "B−" on an A+ to F scale.

Roger Ebert gave a positive review, explaining, "Ang Lee is trying to actually deal with the issues in the story of the Hulk, instead of simply cutting to brainless visual effects." Ebert also liked how the Hulk's movements resembled King Kong. Although Peter Travers of Rolling Stone felt Hulk should have been shorter, he heavily praised the action sequences, especially the climax and cliffhanger. Paul Clinton of CNN believed the cast gave strong performances, but in an otherwise positive review, heavily criticized the computer-generated imagery.

Mick LaSalle of the San Francisco Chronicle considered "the film is more thoughtful and pleasing to the eye than any blockbuster in recent memory, but its epic length comes without an epic reward." Ty Burr of The Boston Globe felt "Jennifer Connelly reprises her stand-by-your-messed-up-scientist turn from A Beautiful Mind." Lisa Schwarzbaum of Entertainment Weekly stated, "a big-budget comic-book adaptation has rarely felt so humorless and intellectually defensive about its own pulpy roots."

Hulk received retrospective praise from critics for its artistic difference from other superhero films such as those by Marvel and DC comics. In 2012, Matt Zoller Seitz cited it as one of the few big-budget superhero films that "really departed from formula, in terms of subject matter or tone", writing that the film is "pretty bizarre... in its old-school Freudian psychology, but interesting for that reason". In Scout Tafoya's 2016 video essay on another film directed by Ang Lee, Ride with the Devil, he mentioned Hulk as "Lee's ill-fated but quietly soulful and deeply sad adaptation of The Incredible Hulk comics". In 2018, Peter Sobczynski of RogerEbert.com wrote that the film is "a genuinely great example of cinematic pop art that deserves a reappraisal". One article calls it a "road not taken" in comic book adaptations. The author praised Popeye, Dick Tracy, and Hulk for their use of comic techniques such as "masking, paneling, and page layout" in ways the DC Extended Universe and Marvel Cinematic Universe do not.

In 2023, Ang Lee reflected the film’s reaction and cult following:“So [Hulk] is like Crouching Tiger, I did it once and that was that. I’m glad I did those things, but I was not comfortable when the movie came out and got this mixed reaction. It was confusing for the market. I wasn’t happy about that. But I worked certainly very hard. I was very proud of the filmmakers who made the movie with me. And then only years later, I didn’t know there was kind of a subculture. It was like a cult movie, but it wasn’t meant to be that way. It was a big, expensive studio movie. But I’m happy some people like you really like it. I’m happy about that, something very cool about it.“

Accolades
Connelly and Danny Elfman received nominations at the 30th Saturn Awards with Best Actress and Best Music. The film was nominated for Best Science Fiction Film but lost out to X2, another movie based on Marvel characters. Dennis Muren, Michael Lantieri, and the special effects crew were nominated for Best Special Effects.

Future

Canceled sequel
In March 2002, during filming for Hulk, producer Avi Arad targeted a May 2005 theatrical release date for a sequel. Upon the film's release, screenwriter James Schamus started to plan a sequel featuring Hulk's Grey Hulk persona and considered using the Leader and the Abomination as villains. Marvel asked for Abomination's inclusion to be an actual threat to Hulk, unlike General Ross. The project ultimately never launched due to Universal not meeting the deadline to begin filming.

Marvel Cinematic Universe

In January 2006, Marvel Studios reacquired the film rights to the character, and writer Zak Penn began work on a sequel titled The Incredible Hulk. However, Edward Norton rewrote Penn's script after signing on to star, retelling the origin story in flashbacks and revelations, to establish the film as a reboot; director Louis Leterrier agreed with this approach. Leterrier acknowledged that the only remaining similarity between the two films was Bruce hiding in South America.

Amid the rumors of Tobey Maguire and Andrew Garfield returning to reprise their roles in Spider-Man: No Way Home which later turned out to be true, Bana was interviewed by Jake Hamilton to promote his new film The Dry. When asked if he would be willing to reprise his role as his version of Bruce Banner in a future MCU project alongside Ruffalo's version of the character, Bana replied:

References

External links

 
 
  
 
 

 
2003 films
2000s English-language films
2003 science fiction action films
2000s monster movies
2000s superhero films
American science fiction action films
American superhero films
Films about father–son relationships
Films about diseases
Films about dysfunctional families
Films about nuclear war and weapons
Films about shapeshifting
Films based on American comics
Films directed by Ang Lee
Films set in the 2000s
Films set in 1966
Films set in 1984
Films set in 2003
Films set in San Francisco
Films set in the San Francisco Bay Area
Films set in South America
Films shot in Arizona
Films shot in California
Films shot in China
Films shot in Hawaii
Films shot in San Francisco
Films shot in Utah
Films about genetic engineering
Films using motion capture
Films produced by Avi Arad
Films produced by Gale Anne Hurd
Films produced by James Schamus
Films scored by Danny Elfman
Films with screenplays by Michael France
Films with screenplays by James Schamus
Films with screenplays by John Turman
Hulk (comics) films
Radiation health effects in fiction
Superhero drama films
Universal Pictures films
Uxoricide in fiction
2000s American films
Live-action films based on Marvel Comics